Studeno ( or) is a village in the hills north of Postojna in the Inner Carniola region of Slovenia.

Church

The parish church in Studeno is dedicated to Saint James and belongs to the Roman Catholic Diocese of Koper.

References

External links

Studeno on Geopedia

Populated places in the Municipality of Postojna